The Nicolosi globular projection is a polyconic map projection invented about the year 1,000 by the Iranian polymath al-Biruni. As a circular representation of a hemisphere, it is called globular because it evokes a globe. It can only display one hemisphere at a time and so normally appears as a "double hemispheric" presentation in world maps. The projection came into use in the Western world starting in 1660, reaching its most common use in the 19th century. As a "compromise" projection, it preserves no particular properties, instead giving a balance of distortions.

History
Abū Rayḥān Muḥammad ibn Aḥmad Al-Bīrūnī, who was the foremost Muslim scholar of the Islamic Golden Age, invented the first recorded globular projection for use in celestial maps about the year 1000. Centuries later, as Europe entered its Age of Discovery, the demand for world maps increased rapidly, sparking a vast experimentation with diverse map projections. Globular projections were one category that received early attention, with inventions by Roger Bacon in the 13th century, Petrus Apianus in the 16th century, and also in the 16th century by French Jesuit priest Georges Fournier. In 1660, Giovanni Battista Nicolosi, a Sicilian chaplain in Rome, reinvented Al-Biruni's projection as a modification of Fournier's first projection. It is unlikely Nicolosi knew of al-Biruni's work, and Nicolosi's name is the one usually associated with the projection.

Nicolosi published a set of maps on the projection, one of the world in two hemispheres, and one each for the five known continents. Maps using the same projection appeared occasionally over the ensuring centuries, becoming relatively common in the 19th century as the stereographic projection fell out of common use for this purpose. Use of the Nicolosi projection continued into the early 20th century. It is rarely seen today.

Description

The construction of the Nicolosi globular projection is fairly simple with compasses and straightedge.
Given a bounding circle to fit the map into, the poles are placed at the top and bottom of the circle, and the central meridian of the desired hemisphere is drawn as a straight vertical diameter between them.
The equator is drawn as a straight horizontal diameter.
Each remaining meridian is drawn as a circular arc going through both poles and the equator,
such that meridians are equally spaced along the equator.
Each remaining parallel is also drawn as a circular arc from the left edge through the central meridian to the right edge of the circle,
such that the parallels are equally spaced around the perimeter of the circle and also equally spaced along the central meridian.

A hemisphere shown with the Nicolosi globular projection closely resembles a hemisphere shown with the azimuthal equidistant projection centered on the same point.
In both projection of that hemisphere, the meridians are equally spaced along the equator, and the parallels are equally spaced along the central meridian and also equally spaced along the perimeter of the circle.

Nicolosi developed the projection as a drafting technique. Translating that into mathematical formulae yields:

Under certain circumstances, the full formulae fail. Use the following formulae instead:

When ,

When ,

When ,

When ,

See also

List of map projections

References

External links
Image of Nicolosi's world map at the David Rumsey collection.

Map projections